Rahel Kopp (born 18 March 1994) is a Swiss World Cup alpine ski racer, and specializes in the technical events of Slalom and Giant slalom. She made her World Cup debut at age 19 in October 2013, and her best finish is a fourth place in a combined event in

World Cup results

Season standings

Top ten finishes

 0 podiums; 3 top tens

References

External links
 
 
Rahel Kopp at Swiss Ski team official site 
 

1994 births
Swiss female alpine skiers
Living people
21st-century Swiss women